Lena Ek (born 16 January 1958 in Mönsterås, Kalmar County) is a Swedish politician who served as Minister for the Environment from 2011 to 2014. She is a former Member of the European Parliament and Member of the Riksdag. She is a member of the Centre Party, part of the Alliance of Liberals and Democrats for Europe.

She sat on the European Parliament's Committee on Industry, Research and Energy. She was also a substitute for the Committee on Women's Rights and Gender Equality and the Committee on the Environment, Public Health and Food Safety, and a member of the delegation to the ACP-EU Joint Parliamentary Assembly.

Her son, Magnus Ek, was chairman of the Centre Party Youth from 2015 to 2019.

Career
 Degree in law
 University lecturer in the Faculty of Law, Lund University (1987–1994)
 District Chairwoman, Centre Party, Östergötland (1993–1995)
 Chairwoman of Centre Party women's association (1998–2000)
 Member of the Centre Party executive (since 1998)
 Member of the party's executive committee (since 2000)
 Municipal Commissioner, Valdemarsvik (1994–1998)
 County councillor and substitute member of the Östergötland County Council Executive Committee (1994–1998)
 Member of the Swedish Parliament (1998–2004)
 Centre Party's spokesman on economic policy (1998–2004)
 Member of the European Parliament (2004-2011)
 Minister for the Environment (2011– 2014)

External links
European Parliament biography

Lena Ek's weblog 

1958 births
21st-century women MEPs for Sweden
Centre Party (Sweden) MEPs
Living people
Members of the Riksdag 1998–2002
Members of the Riksdag 2002–2006
Members of the Riksdag 2014–2018
Members of the Riksdag from the Centre Party (Sweden)
MEPs for Sweden 2004–2009
MEPs for Sweden 2009–2014
Municipal commissioners of Sweden
People from Mönsterås Municipality
Swedish Ministers for the Environment
Swedish women bloggers
Women government ministers of Sweden
Women mayors of places in Sweden
Women members of the Riksdag